True Glacier is a glacier on the west side of Bear Peninsula, flowing southwest into Dotson Ice Shelf south of Hunt Bluff, on the Walgreen Coast, Marie Byrd Land. Mapped by United States Geological Survey (USGS) from U.S. Navy aerial photographs taken in 1966. Named by Advisory Committee on Antarctic Names (US-ACAN) in 1977 after Lawrence E. True, U.S. Navy radioman who to that time had served in three deployments of Operation Deep Freeze.

References

Glaciers of Marie Byrd Land